Juan José Urquizu Sustaeta (24 June 1901 – 22 November 1982) was a Spanish football player and manager.

Career
Born in Ondarroa (Biscay, Basque Country), Urquizu played as a defender for Osasuna, Real Madrid, Athletic Bilbao and Barakaldo. He was capped once by Spain, in 1929.

He managed Athletic Bilbao, Barakaldo, Real Oviedo, Real Murcia, Levante, Ourense and Alavés. He was a La Liga and Copa del Rey winner as both player and coach at Athletic.

Personal life
His son Luis was also a footballer. They are related to footballers Ander Garitano and Gaizka Garitano, the latter of whom also managed Athletic Bilbao.

References

1901 births
1982 deaths
Spanish footballers
Real Madrid CF players
CA Osasuna players
RCD Espanyol footballers
Athletic Bilbao footballers
Barakaldo CF footballers
La Liga players
Segunda División players
Association football defenders
Spanish football managers
Athletic Bilbao managers
Barakaldo CF managers
Real Oviedo managers
Real Murcia managers
Levante UD managers
CD Ourense managers
Deportivo Alavés managers
La Liga managers
Segunda División managers
Spain international footballers
Footballers from the Basque Country (autonomous community)
Sportspeople from Biscay
People from Ondarroa
SD Deusto players
SD Erandio Club players